Kimberly Camilla Jones-Rosales (born 4 August 1987) is a British-born Australian digital creative and fashion influencer on social media. She is also a blogger, stylist, designer and photographer. Her website Miss Jones is an online platform of editorials featuring fashion, travel and lifestyle.

Professional career
Jones began her career as a model when she moved to the Philippines in 2010. She started her fashion website in 2011. Jones has worked with Christian Dior, Louis Vuitton, Tommy Hilfiger, IWC Schaffhausen and Shoes of Prey. In 2016, Jones designed and launched a five piece capsule shoe collection with US-based label Shoes of Prey.

Her television credits include a short stint as TV Presenter on ETC's Etcetera and a guest appearance on the Asia's Next Top Model.

Jones has appeared on the cover of a number of fashion magazines including Rogue Magazine, L'Officiel Manila, L'Officiel Singapore  and Preview Magazine and been featured in Coveteur.

Personal life
Jones was born in the United Kingdom on 4 August 1987, before spending most of her life in Australia. She moved to the Philippines in December 2010. Jones married actor Jericho Rosales on 1 May 2014 in Boracay, Philippines.

References

1987 births
Living people
Australian bloggers
Australian women bloggers
Australian expatriates in the Philippines